Nursie! Nursie! is a 1916 British silent comedy film directed by Alexander Butler and starring James W. Tate, Clarice Mayne and Bernard Vaughan. It was made at Isleworth Studios.

Cast
 James W. Tate as Patient  
 Clarice Mayne as Nurse 
 Bernard Vaughan as Doctor 
 Percy C. Johnson as Pageboy

References

Bibliography
 Harris, Ed. Britain's Forgotten Film Factory: The Story of Isleworth Studios. Amberley Publishing, 2013.

External links

1916 films
1916 comedy films
British silent short films
British comedy films
Films directed by Alexander Butler
Films shot at Isleworth Studios
British black-and-white films
1910s English-language films
1910s British films
Silent comedy films